The Turkish Education Association was established on January 1, 1928, under Atatürk's vision and leadership. The organization acquired the status of an 'association for public benefit' in the resolution of the Council of Ministers, on December 12, 1939. Atatürk always believed in the indisputable role of education in the modernization of Turkey.

Notes

See also
 TED Ankara College Foundation Schools
 TED Kayseri Koleji

External links
TED

1928 establishments in Turkey
Education in Turkey
Organizations based in Ankara